Oscar Emmanuel Peterson  (August 15, 1925 – December 23, 2007) was a Canadian virtuoso jazz pianist and composer. Considered one of the greatest jazz pianists of all time, Peterson released more than 200 recordings, won eight Grammy Awards, as well as a lifetime achievement award from the Recording Academy, and received numerous other awards and honours. He played thousands of concerts worldwide in a career lasting more than 60 years. He was called the "Maharaja of the keyboard" by Duke Ellington, simply "O.P." by his friends, and informally in the jazz community as "the King of inside swing".

Biography

Early years
Peterson was born in Montreal, Quebec, to immigrants from the West Indies (Saint Kitts and Nevis and the British Virgin Islands); His mother, Kathleen, was a domestic worker; his father, Daniel, worked as a porter for Canadian Pacific Railway and was an amateur musician who taught himself to play the organ, trumpet and piano. Peterson grew up in the neighbourhood of Little Burgundy in Montreal. It was in this predominantly black neighbourhood that he encountered the jazz culture. At the age of five, Peterson began honing his skills on trumpet and piano, but a bout of tuberculosis when he was seven prevented him from playing the trumpet again, so he directed all his attention to the piano. His father was one of his first music teachers, and his sister Daisy taught him classical piano. Peterson was persistent at practising scales and classical études.

As a child, Peterson studied with Hungarian-born pianist Paul de Marky, a student of István Thomán, who was himself a pupil of Franz Liszt, so his early training was predominantly based on classical piano. But he was captivated by traditional jazz and boogie-woogie and learned several ragtime pieces. He was called "the Brown Bomber of the Boogie-Woogie".

At the age of nine, Peterson played piano with a degree of control that impressed professional musicians. For many years his piano studies included four to six hours of daily practice. Only in his later years did he decrease his practice to one or two hours daily. In 1940, at fourteen years of age, he won the national music competition organized by the Canadian Broadcasting Corporation. After that victory, he dropped out of the High School of Montreal, where he played in a band with Maynard Ferguson. He became a professional pianist, starring in a weekly radio show and playing at hotels and music halls. In his teens he was a member of the Johnny Holmes Orchestra. From 1945 to 1949 he worked in a trio and recorded for Victor Records. He gravitated toward boogie-woogie and swing with a particular fondness for Nat King Cole and Teddy Wilson. By the time he was in his 20s, he had developed a reputation as a technically brilliant and melodically inventive pianist.

Duos, trios, and quartets
According to an interview with Norman Granz in the 2021 documentary Oscar Peterson: Black + White, he heard a radio program broadcasting from a local club while taking a cab to the Montreal airport. He was so impressed that he told the driver to take him to the club so he could meet the pianist. Granz had seen Peterson before this but was underwhelmed. In 1949 he introduced Peterson in New York City at a Jazz at the Philharmonic concert at Carnegie Hall. He remained Peterson's manager for most of his career. This was more than a managerial relationship; Peterson praised Granz for standing up for him and other black jazz musicians in the segregationist south US of the 1950s and 1960s. In the documentary video Music in the Key of Oscar, Peterson tells how Granz stood up to a gun-toting Southern policeman who wanted to stop the trio from using "whites-only" taxis.

In 1950, Peterson worked in a duo with double bassist  Ray Brown. Two years later they added guitarist Barney Kessel. Then Herb Ellis stepped in after Kessel grew weary of touring. The trio remained together from 1953 to 1958, often touring with Jazz at the Philharmonic.

Peterson also worked in duos with Sam Jones, Niels-Henning Ørsted Pedersen, Joe Pass, Irving Ashby, Count Basie,  and Herbie Hancock.

He considered the trio with Brown and Ellis "the most stimulating" and productive setting for public performances and studio recordings. In the early 1950s, he began performing with Brown and drummer Charlie Smith as the Oscar Peterson Trio. Shortly afterward Smith was replaced by guitarist Irving Ashby, who had been a member of the Nat King Cole Trio. Ashby, who was a swing guitarist, was soon replaced by Kessel. Their last recording, On the Town with the Oscar Peterson Trio, recorded live at the Town Tavern in Toronto, captured a remarkable degree of emotional as well as musical understanding among three players.

When Ellis departed in 1958, they hired drummer Ed Thigpen because they felt no guitarist could compare to Ellis. Brown and Thigpen worked with Peterson on his albums Night Train and Canadiana Suite. Both left in 1965 and were replaced by bassist Sam Jones and drummer Louis Hayes (and later, drummer Bobby Durham). The trio performed together until 1970. In 1969 Peterson recorded Motions and Emotions with orchestral arrangements of "Yesterday" and "Eleanor Rigby" by The Beatles. In the fall of 1970, Peterson's trio released the album Tristeza on Piano. Jones and Durham left in 1970.

In the 1970s Peterson formed a trio with guitarist Joe Pass and bassist Niels-Henning Ørsted Pedersen. This trio emulated the success of the 1950s trio with Brown and Ellis and gave acclaimed performances at festivals. Their album The Trio won the 1974 Grammy Award for Best Jazz Performance by a Group. On April 22, 1978, Peterson performed in the interval act for the Eurovision Song Contest 1978 that was broadcast live from the Palais des congrès de Paris. In 1974 he added British drummer Martin Drew. This quartet toured and recorded extensively worldwide. Pass said in a 1976 interview, "The only guys I've heard who come close to total mastery of their instruments are Art Tatum and Peterson".

Peterson was open to experimental collaborations with jazz musicians such as saxophonist Ben Webster, trumpeter Clark Terry, and vibraphonist Milt Jackson. In 1961, the Peterson trio with Jackson recorded the album Very Tall. His solo recordings were rare until  Exclusively for My Friends (MPS), a series of albums that were his response to pianists such as Bill Evans and McCoy Tyner. He recorded for Pablo, led by Norman Granz, after the label was founded in 1973, including the soundtrack for the 1978 thriller The Silent Partner. In the 1980s he played in a duo with pianist Herbie Hancock. In the late 1980s and 1990s, after a stroke, he made performances and recordings with his protégé Benny Green. In the 1990s and 2000s he recorded several albums accompanied by a combo for Telarc.

Ill health and later years

Peterson had arthritis from his youth, and in later years he had trouble buttoning his shirt. He had hip replacement surgery in the early 1990s. Although the surgery was successful, his mobility was still hampered. In 1993, a stroke weakened his left side and removed him from work for two years. During the same year, incoming prime minister Jean Chrétien, his friend and fan, offered him the position of  Lieutenant-Governor of Ontario. According to Chrétien, Peterson declined the job due to ill health related to the stroke.

Although he recovered some dexterity in his left hand, his piano playing was diminished, and his style relied principally on his right hand. In 1995 he returned to occasional public performances and recorded for Telarc. In 1997 he received the Grammy Lifetime Achievement Award and an International Jazz Hall of Fame Award. His friend, Canadian politician and amateur pianist Bob Rae, said, "a one-handed Oscar was better than just about anyone with two hands."

In 2003, Peterson recorded the DVD A Night in Vienna for Verve with Niels-Henning Ørsted Pedersen, Ulf Wakenius, and Martin Drew. He continued to tour the U.S. and Europe, though at most one month a year, with rest between concerts.

In 2007, his health declined. He canceled his plans to perform at the Toronto Jazz Festival and a Carnegie Hall all-star concert that was to be given in his honour. Peterson died on December 23, 2007, of kidney failure at his home in Mississauga, Ontario.

In 2021, Barry Avrich produced a documentary on Peterson's life titled Oscar Peterson: Black + White that had its world premiere at the Toronto International Film Festival.

Personal life
Peterson was married four times. He had seven children with three of his wives. He smoked cigarettes and a pipe and often tried to break the habit, but he gained weight every time he stopped. He loved to cook and remained overweight throughout his life.

Composer and teacher

Peterson taught piano and improvisation in Canada, mainly in Toronto. With associates, he started and headed the Advanced School of Contemporary Music in Toronto for five years during the 1960s, but it closed because touring called him and his associates away, and it did not have government funding. Later, he mentored the York University jazz program and was the Chancellor of the university for several years in the early 1990s. He published jazz piano etudes for practice. He asked his students to study the music of Johann Sebastian Bach, especially The Well-Tempered Clavier, the Goldberg Variations, and The Art of Fugue, considering these piano pieces essential for every serious pianist. Among his students were pianists Benny Green and Oliver Jones.

Influences
Peterson was influenced by Teddy Wilson, Nat King Cole, James P. Johnson, and Art Tatum, to whom many compared Peterson in later years. After his father played a record of Tatum's "Tiger Rag", he was intimidated and disillusioned, quitting the piano for several weeks. "Tatum scared me to death," said Peterson, adding that he was "never cocky again" about his ability at the piano. Tatum was a model for Peterson's musicianship during the 1940s and 1950s. Tatum and Peterson became good friends, although Peterson was always shy about being compared to Tatum and rarely played the piano in Tatum's presence.

Peterson also credited his sister—a piano teacher in Montreal who also taught several other Canadian jazz musicians—with being an important teacher and influence on his career. Under his sister's tutelage, Peterson expanded into classical piano training and broadened his range while mastering the core classical pianism from scales to preludes and fugues by Johann Sebastian Bach.

Building on Tatum's pianism and aesthetics, Peterson also absorbed Tatum's musical influences, notably from piano concertos by Sergei Rachmaninoff. Rachmaninoff's harmonizations, as well as direct quotations from his 2nd Piano Concerto, are scattered throughout many recordings by Peterson, including his work with the most familiar formulation of the Oscar Peterson Trio, with bassist Ray Brown and guitarist Herb Ellis. During the 1960s and 1970s Peterson made numerous trio recordings highlighting his piano performances; they reveal more of his eclectic style, absorbing influences from various genres of jazz, popular, and classical music.

According to pianist and educator Mark Eisenman, some of Peterson's best playing was as an understated accompanist to singer Ella Fitzgerald and trumpeter Roy Eldridge.

Peterson is considered one of history's great jazz pianists He was called the "Maharaja of the keyboard" by Duke Ellington, simply "O.P." by his friends, and informally in the jazz community as "the King of inside swing".

Awards and honours

Grammy Awards
1975 Best Jazz Performance by a Group The Trio
1977 Best Jazz Performance by a Soloist The Giants 
1978 Best Jazz Instrumental Performance, Soloist Oscar Peterson Jam – Montreux '77
1979 Best Jazz Instrumental Performance, Soloist Oscar Peterson and The Trumpet Kings – Jousts
1990 Best Jazz Instrumental Performance, Group Live at the Blue Note
1990 Best Jazz Instrumental Performance, Soloist The Legendary Oscar Peterson Trio Live at the Blue Note
1991 Best Jazz Instrumental Performance, Group Saturday Night at the Blue Note
1997 Lifetime Achievement Award Instrumental Soloist Lifetime Achievement

Other awards

 Pianist of the year, DownBeat magazine, 1950, and won again for the next 12 years
 Order of Canada, Officer, 1972; Companion, 1984
 Canadian Version of the Queen Elizabeth II Silver Jubilee Medal, 1977
 Canadian Music Hall of Fame, 1978
 Martin Luther King Jr. Achievement Award, Black Theatre Workshop, 1986
 Roy Thomson Award, 1987
 Toronto Arts Award for lifetime achievement, 1991
 Governor General's Performing Arts Award, 1992
 Order of Ontario, member 1992
 125th Anniversary of the Confederation of Canada Medal, 1992
 Glenn Gould Prize, 1993
 International Society for Performing Artists award, 1995
 Loyola Medal of Concordia University, 1997
 Praemium Imperiale World Art Award, 1999
 Oscar Peterson Concert Hall named at Concordia University, 1999
 UNESCO Music Prize, 2000
 Toronto Musicians' Association Musician of the Year, 2001
 Canadian Version of the Queen Elizabeth II Golden Jubilee Medal, 2002
 SOCAN Special Achievement Award, 2008
 Canada's Walk of Fame, 2013
 Canadian Jazz and Blues Hall of Fame
 Juno Award Hall of Fame
 BBC Radio Lifetime Achievement Award
 National Order of Quebec, Chevalier 
 Ordre des Arts et des Lettres, France
 Civic Award of Merit, City of Mississauga, 2003
 Oscar Peterson Theatre, Canadian Embassy, Tokyo, Japan, 2007
 Oscar Peterson Hall, University of Toronto Mississauga, 2008
 Oscar Peterson Public School, Stouffville, 2009 
 Parc Oscar-Peterson, Little Burgundy, Montreal, renamed in Peterson's honour 2009
 Statue of Oscar Peterson unveiled in Ottawa by Queen Elizabeth II, 2010
 Jazz Born Here, mural by Gene Pendon depicting Oscar Peterson, at Rue Saint-Jacques and Rue des Seigneurs in Montreal
 Historica Canada Heritage Minute, 2021
Honorary degrees from Berklee College of Music, Carleton University, Queen's University, Concordia University, Université Laval, McMaster University, Mount Allison University, Niagara University, Northwestern University, University of Toronto, University of the West Indies, University of Western Ontario, University of Victoria, and York University
 (Announced) Public square to be named in honour of Oscar Peterson, Montreal, 2021

Instruments 
Bösendorfer pianos – 1980s and 2000s, some performances from the 70s onward.
Yamaha – Acoustic and Disklavier; used from 1998–2006 in Canada (Touring and Recording)
Steinway & Sons Model A (which currently resides at Village Studios in Los Angeles) – most performances from the 1940s through the 1980s, some recordings.
Baldwin pianos – some performances in the US, some recordings.
C. Bechstein Pianofortefabrik pianos – some performances and recordings in Europe.
Petrof pianos – some performances in Europe.
Clavichord – on album Porgy and Bess with Joe Pass
Fender Rhodes electric piano – several recordings.
Synthesizer – several recordings.
Hammond organ – some live performances and several recordings.
Vocals – some live performances and several recordings.

Discography

See also 

Music of Canada
 List of jazz pianists

References

External links

 Obituary at Canadian Broadcasting Corporation, December 24, 2007
 Obituary at The Montreal Gazette, December 24, 2007
 Obituary at The Guardian, December 25, 2007
 Obituary at The Independent, December 26, 2007
 With Marian McPartland on Piano Jazz 
 Video interview in which his passion for photography is discussed
 "Oscar Peterson, A Portrait", essay from 2002
 At Jazz Police
 Entry at the Jazz Discography Project
 Discography
 Oscar Peterson: A Jazz Sensation—A Virtual Exhibition
 Oscar Peterson postage stamp
 CBC Digital Archives: Oscar Peterson: A Jazz Giant
 Oscar Peterson's Concert Hall
 Piano transcriptions
 

 
 

1925 births
2007 deaths
20th-century Canadian keyboardists
20th-century Canadian pianists
20th-century jazz composers
20th-century Canadian male musicians
Anglophone Quebec people
Bebop pianists
Black Canadian musicians
Canadian jazz bandleaders
Canadian jazz composers
Canadian jazz pianists
Canadian male pianists
Canadian Music Hall of Fame inductees
Canadian organists
Canadian people of Saint Kitts and Nevis descent
Chancellors of York University
Companions of the Order of Canada
Composers awarded knighthoods
Deaths from kidney failure
Fellows of the Royal Conservatory of Music
Glenn Gould Prize winners
Grammy Lifetime Achievement Award winners
High School of Montreal alumni
Juno Award for Best Jazz Album winners
Knights of the National Order of Quebec
Mack Avenue Records artists
Mainstream jazz pianists
Male jazz composers
Members of the Order of Ontario
Members of the United Church of Canada
Mercury Records artists
MPS Records artists
Musicians awarded knighthoods
Musicians from Montreal
Oscar Peterson Trio members
Pablo Records artists
People from Le Sud-Ouest
People of British Virgin Islands descent
RCA Victor artists
Recipients of the Praemium Imperiale
Telarc Records artists
The Royal Conservatory of Music alumni
Verve Records artists
York University